Laranjal may refer to the following places in Brazil:

Laranjal, Minas Gerais
Laranjal, Paraná
Praia do Laranjal, Rio Grande do Sul
Laranjal Paulista, São Paulo